Brunei participated at the 2018 Asian Para Games which was held in Jakarta, Indonesia from 6 to 13 October 2018. The Bruneian delegation consisted of eight athletes competing in two sports, athletics and ten-pin bowling, and eight officials. Brunei's chef de mission for the games was Haji Rosmadee bin Haji Md Daud.

See also
 Brunei at the 2018 Asian Games

References

External links
 Brunei Contingent Programme Book

 
2018
Nations at the 2018 Asian Para Games
Para